Frank Zappa (1940–1993) was an American musician, songwriter, composer, recording engineer, record producer and film director.

Zappa may also refer to:
Zappa (surname), including a list of people with the name
Zappa (chess), a computer chess program
Zappa (film), a 1983 Danish film by Bille August
Zappa (Guilty Gear), a character from Guilty Gear
Zappa, a 2020 documentary film about Frank Zappa
Zappa, a character in Chrono Cross
Zappa, a group of meerkats in Meerkat Manor

See also
Pachygnatha zappa, a spider
Zappa confluentus, the New Guinea slender mudskipper, endemic to New Guinea 
Zappa–Szép product,  a way in which a group can be constructed from two subgroups. It is a generalization of the direct and semidirect products